The 2012 Japanese motorcycle Grand Prix was the fifteenth round of the 2012 Grand Prix motorcycle racing season. It took place on the weekend of 12–14 October 2012 at the Twin Ring Motegi, located in Motegi, Japan.

Classification

MotoGP

Moto2

Moto3

Championship standings after the race (MotoGP)
Below are the standings for the top five riders and constructors after round fifteen has concluded.

Riders' Championship standings

Constructors' Championship standings

 Note: Only the top five positions are included for both sets of standings.

References

Japanese motorcycle Grand Prix
Japanese
Motorcycle Grand Prix
Japanese motorcycle Grand Prix